Cheng Yu-hsuan, also sometimes known as Kevin Cheng (Born 2 May 1988) is a Taiwanese professional pool player, representing Chinese Taipei. Yu-Hsuan reached world number 1 in 9-Ball in 2016, following winning U.S. Open 9-Ball Championships in 2015. He also reached the semi-finals of the 2016 WPA World Nine-ball Championship; where he would lose to Shane Van Boening 11–9.

Achievements
 2019 WPA Players Championship
 2015 U.S. Open 9-Ball Championship
 2015 CBSA Miyun 9-Ball Open

References

External links

Taiwanese pool players
Living people
1988 births
Place of birth missing (living people)